

August Krakau (September 12, 1894 – January 7, 1975) was a German general in the Wehrmacht during World War II who commanded the 7th Mountain Division. He was a recipient of the Knight's Cross of the Iron Cross of Nazi Germany.

Awards and decorations

 Knight's Cross of the Iron Cross on 21 June 1941 as Oberst and commander of Gebirgsjäger-Regiment 85

References

Citations

Bibliography

 

1894 births
1976 deaths
People from Pirmasens
People from the Palatinate (region)
Lieutenant generals of the German Army (Wehrmacht)
German Army personnel of World War I
Recipients of the clasp to the Iron Cross, 1st class
Recipients of the Knight's Cross of the Iron Cross
Recipients of the Order of the Cross of Liberty, 1st Class
Recipients of the Military Merit Cross (Bavaria)
German prisoners of war in World War II held by the United Kingdom
Battle of Crete
Military personnel from Rhineland-Palatinate
German Army generals of World War II
Gebirgsjäger of World War II